The 1956 Stanley Cup Finals was the championship series of the National Hockey League's (NHL) 1955–56 season, and the culmination of the 1956 Stanley Cup playoffs. The Canadiens were appearing in their sixth consecutive Finals, the Red Wings their third. The Canadiens won the series, four games to one.

Paths to the Finals
Montreal defeated the New York Rangers 4–1 to reach the final. Detroit defeated the Toronto Maple Leafs 4–1 to reach the final.

Game summaries
The Canadiens, down 4–2 after two periods, scored four unanswered goals, in a 5:29 span, in the third period to win game one 6–4 at the Forum. Jacques Plante held the Red Wings to just ten goals in the five games. This was the first Final for Henri Richard and former Habs player Toe Blake's first Final as coach.

Stanley Cup engraving
The 1956 Stanley Cup was presented to Canadiens captain Emile Bouchard by NHL President Clarence Campbell following the Canadiens 3–1 win over the Red Wings in game five.

The following Canadiens players and staff had their names engraved on the Stanley Cup

1955–56 Montreal Canadiens

Stanley Cup engraving
 Emile "Butch" Bouchard was engraved on the Stanley Cup in 1944, 1946 and 1953 as EMILE BOUCHARD. He was then engraved on the Stanley Cup as BUTCH BOUCHARD in 1956.
 In a mistake, Bob Turner is listed as Trainer when the Stanley Cup was redone in 1957–58, but he played defence. Hector Dubois and Gaston Bettez were the trainers, but no position was listed. These mistakes were not corrected on the Replica Cup created in 1992–93.
 In a mistake, Claude Provost's name was misspelt C. PREVOST with an "E" instead of an "O". Provost spelling mistake was also not corrected on the Replica Cup created in 1992–93.
 In a mistake, Gaston Bettez was spelt wrong as G BETTEX when the Cup was redone in 1957–58 with an "X" instead of "Z", and the mistake was repeated on the Replica Cup. His name was spelt correctly on the original ring as G. BETTEZ.
 Hector "Toe" Blake was the ninth rookie coach to win the Stanley Cup.
 The 1956 Montreal Canadiens filled the last spot on the Stanley Cup. (See 1958 Stanley Cup Finals change)

See also
 1955–56 NHL season

Notes

References

 Podnieks, Andrew; Hockey Hall of Fame (2004). Lord Stanley's Cup. Bolton, Ont.: Fenn Pub. pp 12, 50. 

Stanley Cup
Stanley Cup Finals
Detroit Red Wings games
Montreal Canadiens games
Ice hockey competitions in Montreal
Ice hockey competitions in Detroit
March 1956 sports events in North America
April 1956 sports events in North America
1950s in Montreal
1956 in Quebec
Stanley Cup
1956 in Detroit